Sainik School Rewa is one of the 28 Sainik Schools of India.  It is a purely residential school for boys.  The medium of instruction is English.  Established by Government of India on 20 July 1962 at the sprawling estate known as Yuvraj Bhawan which belonged to Maharaja Martand Singh Judeo, Yuvraj of former Princely state of Rewa, the school prepares boys to join the armed forces. The school has contributed about 950 officers.  It is affiliated to Central Board of Secondary Education and is a member of Indian Public Schools Conference (IPSC).

The school prepares boys for entry into the National Defence Academy, Khadakwasla, Pune and Indian Naval Academy (INA).

Administration 
The administration of Sainik School is vested in an autonomous body known as Sainik Schools Society under Ministry of Defence, India. Sainik Schools Society is headed by the Board of Governors under the Chairmanship of Raksha Mantri. The Chief Ministers/Education Ministers of the states where the Sainik Schools are located, are members of the Board of Governors. There is a Local Board of Administration for each school with a senior defense service officer as its Chairman. The Air Officer Commanding-in-Chief, Central Air Command, Allahabad is the Chairman of the board for Sainik School Rewa. The Principal is the administrative and academic head of the institute. He is assisted by two other service officers viz. Headmaster and Registrar. The service officers are specialty selected and are on deputation from Ministry of Defense.

Campus 

Sainik School Rewa is located in Rewa, in the Indian state Madhya Pradesh. The campus spreads across  of land. The climate of Rewa is dry in summer and quite cold in winters.  Rewa is located on the Varanasi–Kanyakumari highway (NH 7) at a distance of 550 km  from Bhopal, 235 km from Jabalpur and 578 km from Raipur.  It is accessible by road and rail.  The school is 2 km from Rewa Bus stand and 6 km away from Rewa Railway Station. Direct trains are available from Bhopal, Jabalpur, Allahabad and New Delhi.

Main building
The main building houses the administrative office and the office of the Principal, Head Master and Registrar of the school. It has class-rooms for all the students from class VI to XII, an IT centre with fifty computers, laboratories (Physics, Chemistry, Biology and Languages), Auditorium, Library, Art Room, Audio-Visual Room, Wood, Metal and Electrical Workshop.

Hostel Blocks
The school is fully residential. All cadets are accommodated in Dormitories/Hostels (referred as Houses) under direct supervision of Housemasters who act as their guides and guardians. The housemasters are assisted in their job by attached housemaster and Matron/Hostel Superintendents who take care of cadets' personal hygiene and comforts. At present the school has five senior and five junior Houses. Earlier there were three junior houses that were named after the characters of the Mahabharata and Ramayana namely Abhimanyu, Bharat and Luv-Kush.

Senior Houses are named after important rivers and mountain ranges of Madhya Pradesh. The hostels have study room, recreation area, colour TV sets, table tennis rooms etc.

Cadets Mess
The campus has a central mess which caters for members in one sitting. Both vegetarian and non-vegetarian food is served as per choice of the cadets.

Athletic Field
The campus has many playgrounds for different games. Campus has basketball courts, volleyball courts, hockey ground, tennis court, skating rink, swimming pool, horse riding facilities and football fields. It also has one athletic field where annual athletic events are conducted, the field has 400 meter track for racing and other track events, it also has pole vault, high jump, long jump, hammer throw, short-put and triple jump fields. There are three helipads in athletic field.

Admissions
Admissions are given in Class VI, Class IX and Class XI. Admission for classes VI and IX is carried out on the basis of an entrance exam usually held in January. An interview is conducted at Sainik School Rewa and a Medical Exam at Military Hospital Jabalpur.  Admission for class XI is carried out on the basis of the class X results of same year, interview and medical exam. Only science stream is available in the school.

Sale of Admission Form : During the month of October to December

Last date of Submission of Admission form : First week of December

Date of Entrance exam : First Sunday of January

N.C.C.
N.C.C. is an integral part of students' life in Sainik School Rewa. The School has an Independent Company of Junior and Senior Division N.C.C. as integral part. N.C.C. unit of school comprises all the three wings of defence services i.e. the Army, Navy and Air Force.

Sports and Games
Morning P.T. and evening games are compulsory for all cadets. The School has facilities for Volleyball, Basketball, Football, Badminton, Hockey and Tennis. The school has a gym. Coaching is provided by qualified instructors for most of the games. Indoor games like TT, Chess and Carrom are also available. The School has an obstacle course to test and improve students' courage, physical endurance and physique. P.T. is compulsory and all students are to take part in regular physical training, including cross country runs. Centralised  mountaineering and trekking courses are also conducted  by the Sainik Schools Society.

Alumni
Alumni of the Sainik School Rewa or SSR are known as Sainwinian. The school counts numerous politicians, bureaucrats, doctors, engineers, journalists, entrepreneurs, business leaders and a legion of military leaders as its alumni.

Satyavrat Chaturvedi and Sundar Lal Tiwari both active politicians are product of SSR.
	Lt Gen K. T. Parnaik, PVSM, UYSM, YSM (Retd) - Governor of Arunachal Pradesh
   Lt Gen A. K. Singh, PVSM, AVSM, SM, VSM, ADC (Retd) -  Lieutenant Governor of the Andaman and Nicobar Islands.	(Retd)
	Lt Gen Munish Sibal, PVSM, AVSM** (Retd)
	Lt Gen DS Chauhan, PVSM., AVSM (Retd)
	Maj Gen MP Singh (Retd)
   Kuldeep Kumar Kohli, Group Executive Director, HFCL 
	Air Vice Marshal Navin Verma, AVSM (Retd)
	Air Vice Marshal AK Tiwari (Retd)
	Air Marshal PK Roy, PVSM, AVSM, VM, VSM, ADC (Retd)
	Lt Gen Sandeep Singh, AVSM*, SM, VSM
	Lt Gen AT Parnaik SM, VSM
	Maj Gen NP Gadkari
	Maj Gen PN Tripathi, VSM
	Vice Admiral Dinesh Prabhakar, NM, VSM
	Maj Gen VP Chaturvedi
	Rear Admiral Rakesh Pandit NM
	Vice Admiral Atul Jain VSM
   Lokesh Kumar Jatav, IAS
   Rohit Singh, IAS
   Subir Kumar Das, Sound Engineer
   Lt Gen Upendra Dwivedi AVSM

The school alumni have received 3 Vir Chakra, 3 Shaurya Chakra, 4 Sena Medal (Gallantry) and numerous distinguish service medals.

References

External links 
 
 Sainik Schools Society
 Old Website of Sainik School, Rewa
 SSR Messageboard

Sainik schools
Schools in Madhya Pradesh
Boys' schools in India
Educational institutions established in 1962
Boarding schools in Madhya Pradesh
1962 establishments in Madhya Pradesh